The 2019 season is SCG Muangthong United Football Club's 13th existence in the new era since they took over from Nongchok Pittaya Nusorn Football Club in 2007. It is the 3rd season in the Thai League and the club's 11th consecutive season in the top flight of the Thai football league system since promoted in the 2009 season.

Squad

Transfer

Pre-season transfer

In

Out 

Note 1: Pitakpong Kulasuwan returned to the team after the loan but transferred to the same team for loan in 2019.

Return from loan

Mid-season transfer

In

Out

Return from loan

Friendlies

Pre-Season Friendly

Competitions

Overview

Thai League 1

League table

Thai FA Cup

Thai League Cup

References

MTU
2019